Thomas P. Grazulis (born August 17, 1942) is an American meteorologist who has written extensively about tornadoes and is head of The Tornado Project.

Biography

Early career 

Grazulis earned a bachelor's degree in meteorology from Florida State University (FSU) and was briefly a broadcaster, in part presenting the weather. He was a science teacher in New Jersey and worked on the "Earth Science Curriculum Project" with the National Science Foundation (NSF). He and his wife Doris, also a teacher and a small business operator, then moved to the St. Johnsbury, Vermont area in 1970. In 1972, he and Doris released Approaching the Unapproachable, a documentary film on tornadoes that was the first to consider tornadoes in a scientific context rather than as a hazard and was the first compilation of tornado footage.

Tornado database 
In 1979 Grazulis began working with the Nuclear Regulatory Commission (NRC) in creating a history of tornadoes. Specifically, he worked on refining and augmenting the databases of tornadoes maintained by the National Severe Storms Forecast Center (NSSFC) in Kansas City, Missouri as well as the database headed by Ted Fujita at the University of Chicago, with whom he collaborated when developing their respective databases. The objective was to determine tornado occurrence and intensity distributions, i.e. tornado climatology, for risk assessment studies. Grazulis' tornado database work was considered important enough that it was followed by five years of funding from the National Science Foundation.

In the process Grazulis traveled the country visiting dozens of libraries, museums, university archives, historical societies, and the like, to eventually chronicle 60,000 tornadoes, 50,000 of them included in a single 1,400 page book that is widely referenced. He is estimated to have read 25,000 microfilm reels of mostly major newspapers. His work concentrated in state libraries and the U.S. Library of Congress but also included local libraries when pertinent. The first book (which was two volumes), results from the NRC funded work, was Significant Tornadoes, 1880-1989. Sales of the book filled a gap in tornado information and strong sales led to an expansion, Significant Tornadoes, 1680-1991. In turn, sales of this book and of Tornado Project videos and posters were robust enough that an update was published for the years 1992–1995. Significant Tornadoes contains 51 photographs of tornadoes prior to 1970, the most extensive collection published. Grazulis amassed one of three authoritative tornado databases, those being the National Tornado Database assembled and maintained by NOAA agencies, the University of Chicago DAPPL database founded by Fujita which ended at his retirement in 1992, and the Grazulis Tornado Project database. As of 2014, the Grazulis database spans from 1680-1995 and includes all known significant tornadoes (those rated F2-F5 or causing a fatality).

The Tornado Project 
In the early 1990s he and Doris formed The Tornado Project to market tornado videos, books, and posters. He collaborated with storm chaser Roy Britt to produce the popular Tornado Video Classics documentary  series. In 1995 they adapted for television broadcast on The Learning Channel their collection, producing less advanced direct-to video documentaries catering to a wider audience, including Twister: Fury on the Plains and Twister: Nature's Fury. His book Significant Tornadoes is considered a critical and authoritative source among severe storms meteorologists.

In 1997 he became a storm chaser noting that despite his fascination with storms he had never actually seen a tornado. He saw his first tornado, a very large one, near Tulsa, Oklahoma on Memorial Day of that year. By the late 1990s, Grazulis also constructed a variety of designs of physical simulator models of vortices. He used these for air flow experiments and for displays. Grazulis had long been interested in tornado simulators and included earlier laboratory studies in his TVC documentaries. The Secrets of the Tornado documentary featured a detailed instructional section with an accompanying printed guide for constructing one's own.

A page on The Tornado Project's website in 2018 indicates Significant Tornadoes will be updated and released in two volumes of approximately 705 pages each covering tornadoes from 1680 to 1949 and 1950 to 2019. The new volumes will include updates on statistics, graphs, and charts, as well as analysis of trends in tornadic activity and examination of potential influence thereof by climate change.

Affiliations 
Grazulis is a Fellow of the American Meteorological Society (AMS) and was on the Fujita Scale Forum of the Fujita Scale Enhancement Project; which developed the Enhanced Fujita Scale to supplant the original Fujita Scale.

Works 
Grazulis initially produced documentaries on the Earth sciences before focusing on tornadoes and publishing books. He expanded to direct-to-video documentaries (which include extensive printed guides) and posters (with complementary background sheets) in the 1990s. Grazulis also wrote for Storm Track magazine and presented at meteorological and storm chaser conferences. The following is a list of his major works:
 The New Jersey Shoreline (1967 educational film)
 Approaching the Unapproachable (1972 documentary film)
 Tornado Video Classics I
 Tornado Video Classics II: The Magnificent Puzzle
 Tornado Video Classics III
 Secrets of the Tornado (documentary)
 (1984) Violent Tornado Climatology, 1880-1982. NUREG/CR-3670, U.S. Nuclear Regulatory Commission, Washington, DC, 165 pp
 (1993) Significant Tornadoes 1680-1991: A Chronology and Analysis of Events
 (1996) Significant Tornadoes Update 1992-1995
 (2001) The Tornado: Nature's Ultimate Windstorm

Grazulis in 2001 penned a book for a general readership, an homage and unofficial update to Snowden D. Flora's classic Tornadoes of the United States (1953), entitled The Tornado: Nature's Ultimate Windstorm. Both were published by the University of Oklahoma Press.

References

External links 
 The Tornado Project
 
 

American meteorologists
Florida State University alumni
Storm chasers
1942 births
Living people
Fellows of the American Meteorological Society